Helen Björk (born 9 July 1965, as Helen Johansson) is a Swedish former association football forward who won 88 caps and scored 23 goals for the Sweden women's national football team. She helped Sweden win the 1984 European Championship and played at the inaugural 1991 FIFA Women's World Cup.

International career
Johansson made her senior Sweden debut on 26 September 1981; a 7–0 win over the Netherlands at Ryavallen in Borås. She won the first UEFA championships for national women's teams in 1984. Sweden beat England in the final, in a penalty shootout at Kenilworth Road after a 1–1 aggregate draw. She missed the first leg with myocarditis. Restored to the team for the second leg, Johansson had her shot saved by Theresa Wiseman in the shootout, but Elisabeth Leidinge stopped two English penalties.

In 1991 Johannson helped Sweden to a third-place finish at the inaugural FIFA Women's World Cup in Guangdong, China. Playing as a winger behind strikers Lena Videkull and Anneli Andelén, she featured in four of the team's six matches.

Matches and goals scored at World Cup & Olympic tournaments

Matches and goals scored at European Championship tournaments
Helen Johansson participated in four European Championship tournaments: 1984(various locations), Norway 1987, Germany 1989, and 1995(various locations). Sweden won the tournament in 1984, finished second in 1987 & 1995, and took third place in 1989. Johansson's extra time goal in the 1989 consolation match secured the third place finish for Sweden in that tournament.

References

Match reports

External links

Living people
1965 births
Swedish women's footballers
Sweden women's international footballers
Damallsvenskan players
Jitex BK players
GAIS players
Öxabäcks IF players
Women's association football forwards
1991 FIFA Women's World Cup players
UEFA Women's Championship-winning players